HEU may refer to:
 Harbin Engineering University, in Harbin, China
 Highly enriched uranium, uranium that is 20% or more U235
 Hospital Employees' Union, trade union in British Columbia, Canada